Potel is a surname. Notable people with the surname include: 

Christian Potel (born 1973), French football player
Victor Potel (1889–1947), American character actor

See also
Patel